Miss America's Teen is an American scholarship pageant. It is the sister program to the Miss America Organization, and it aims to "promote scholastic achievement, creative accomplishment, healthy living and community involvement for America's teens." In order to be eligible to compete, participants must first compete and win at the local level and then win the state title. The competition consists of several parts of competition which consists of an eight-minute interview in front of a panel of judges, talent, lifestyle and wellness, evening wear, and an on-stage question. All competitors must be girls between the ages of 13 and 18 years of age.

More than $113,000 in scholarship grants were distributed among the 51 contestants in the pageant along with $29 Million in in-kind tuition with 7 universities, with a $30,000 scholarship being awarded to the winner. The chairwoman for the Miss America's Outstanding Teen program is Miss America CEO, Shantel Krebs.

The current titleholder is Morgan Greco of Washington who was crowned on August 12, 2022 at the Hyatt Regency in Dallas, Texas.

In January of 2023, the official name of the pageant was changed from Miss America’s Outstanding Teen, to Miss America’s Teen.

History
The first competition was held in August 2005 in the Linda W. Chapin Theater at the Orange County Convention Center in Orlando, Florida. Meghan Miller, who represented Texas, was the first to win the competition.

Winners

Winners by state

See also
Miss Teen USA 
Miss Teenage America 
Miss Teen America 
Distinguished Young Women (formerly America's Junior Miss)

References

External links 
Official Miss America's Outstanding Teen web site

 
Annual events in Florida
Beauty pageants for youth